The 2014 Men's South American Volleyball Club Championship was the sixth official edition of the men's volleyball tournament, played by eight teams over 19–23 February 2014 in Belo Horizonte, Brazil. The best placed team except 2014 FIVB Volleyball Men's Club World Championship hosts Sada Cruzeiro qualified for the 2014 Club World Championship.

Pools composition

Venue
Vivo Arena, Belo Horizonte, Brazil

Preliminary round
All times are Brasília Time (UTC−03:00).

Pool A

|}

|}

Pool B

|}

|}

Final round
All times are Brasília Time (UTC−03:00).

Bracket

Semifinals

|}

7th place match

|}

5th place match

|}

3rd place match

|}

Final

|}

Final standing

Awards

Most Valuable Player
  Wallace de Souza (Sada Cruzeiro)
Best Setter
  Demián González (UPCN San Juan)
Best Outside Spikers
  Yoandry Leal (Sada Cruzeiro)
  Raphael Thiago Oliveira (Vivo Minas)

Best Middle Blockers
  Isac Santos (Sada Cruzeiro)
  Martín Ramos (UPCN San Juan)
Best Opposite Spiker
  Wallace de Souza (Sada Cruzeiro)
Best Libero
  Sebastián Garrocq (UPCN San Juan)

External links
CSV

Volleyball
Men's South American Volleyball Club Championship
Volleyball
Men's South American Volleyball Club Championship